North Savadkuh County is in Mazandaran province, Iran. The capital of the county is the city of Shirgah. At the 2006 census, the region's population (as Shirgah District of Savadkuh County) was 23,751 in 6,522 households. The following census in 2011 counted 23,409 people in 6,983 households. It was separated from Savadkuh County in 2013. At the 2016 census, the county's population was 24,834 in 8,476 households.

Administrative divisions

The population history and structural changes of North Savadkuh County's administrative divisions over three consecutive censuses are shown in the following table. The latest census shows two districts, four rural districts, and one city.

References

 

Counties of Mazandaran Province